This is a list of public art in New Orleans, in the United States. This list applies only to works of public art on permanent display in an outdoor public space. For example, this does not include artworks in museums. Public art may include sculptures, statues, monuments, memorials, murals, and mosaics.

Public art
New Orleans
New Orleans
Public art
Public art